MOCADI is a Monte Carlo simulation  program used to calculate the transport of charged particle beams--as well as fragmentation and fission products from nuclear reactions in target materials--through ion optical systems described by transfer matrices (including up to third order Taylor expansion coefficients) and through layers of matter.

References

Monte Carlo molecular modelling software